Karin Brienesse (born 17 July 1969 in Breda) is a former freestyle and butterfly swimmer from the Netherlands, who competed in three consequentive Summer Olympics for her native country, starting in 1988. There she won the silver medal with the Dutch 4×100 m freestyle relay team, behind East Germany. Three years later Brienesse won the title in the same event at the European LC Championships 1991 in Athens, Greece.

References

1969 births
Living people
Sportspeople from Breda
Dutch female butterfly swimmers
Dutch female freestyle swimmers
Olympic swimmers of the Netherlands
Swimmers at the 1988 Summer Olympics
Swimmers at the 1992 Summer Olympics
Swimmers at the 1996 Summer Olympics
Olympic silver medalists for the Netherlands
Medalists at the 1988 Summer Olympics
World Aquatics Championships medalists in swimming
European Aquatics Championships medalists in swimming
Olympic silver medalists in swimming
20th-century Dutch women